Karen Morse may refer to:
 Karen Morse (chemist)
 Karen Morse (water skier)